One Fourth Labs is an Indian educational technology company that was incubated at IIT Madras Research Park, Chennai. It was founded by two faculties of Indian Institute of Technology Madras Mitesh Khapra and Pratyush Kumar Panda from the Department of Computer Science, with the aim to educate masses in the field of Artificial Intelligence. Currently, they have launched courses on Deep Learning and Data Science through their PadhAI portal. They have also founded a non-profit organization called AI4Bharat, which is an open community of experts and volunteers aiming to develop AI solutions for the social causes in India.

References

Educational technology companies of India
Indian companies established in 2019
Technology education